WTC may stand for:

Buildings
World Trade Center (disambiguation)
World Trade Center (1973–2001) in New York, a seven-building complex in Lower Manhattan that was destroyed in the September 11, 2001 attacks
World Trade Center (2001–present), a complex in New York under construction to replace the former World Trade Center
Warrenton Training Center, a classified U.S. government complex in Virginia

Arts, entertainment, and media
The Well-Tempered Clavier, a collection of preludes and fugues for keyboard by Johann Sebastian Bach
When They Cry (disambiguation), a Japanese video game series
Waking the Cadaver, a slam death metal band based out of New Jersey 
Wu-Tang Clan, an American hip-hop group

Education
West Toronto Collegiate, a former public high school in Toronto, Ontario, Canada
Western Technical College, a vocational-technical school in La Crosse, Wisconsin
Westminster Theological Centre, a UK-based accredited theological college

Other uses
ICC World Test Championship, a league competition for test cricket run by the International Cricket Council
Wilderness Travel Course, a Sierra Club program that teaches basic mountaineering skills
Willingness to communicate, in second-language acquisition
Women's Timber Corps, a British civilian organisation created during the Second World War to work in forestry
Working tax credit, a state benefit in the United Kingdom made to people who work and have a low income
World Taiwanese Congress, an annual meeting for organizations promoting formal Taiwan independence
World Triathlon Corporation, a for-profit corporation that runs several Triathlon, Ironman, and cycling races